Ritratto di donna velata (i.e. "Portrait of a veiled woman") is a 1975 Italian giallo-fantasy television miniseries directed by Flaminio Bollini and starring Nino Castelnuovo and Daria Nicolodi. It was broadcast on Programma Nazionale.

Cast

Nino Castelnuovo as Luigi Certaldo 
Daria Nicolodi as  Elisa
 Luciano Zuccolini as  Romano  
 Manlio De Angelis as  Sergio 
 Luciana Negrini as  Sandra  
 Mico Cundari as  Alberto Certaldo 
 Nino Dal Fabbro as  Mercani 
Corrado Gaipa as  Nebbia
 Lisa White as Miss Lewis  
Arturo Dominici as  Marston 
Massimo Serato as  Grimaldi 
Paolo Bonacelli as  magistrato 
 Federico Scrobogna as  Walter 
Dada Gallotti  as  Walter's Aunt
 Oliviero Dinelli as  Fosco 
 Gianni Pulone as  Fosco's Brother  
Andrea Aureli as  Bartender 
 Sonia Gessner as The Sculptress
Toni Ucci as Marston's Henchman

References

External links
 

1975 television films
1975 films
Italian television films
Mystery television series
Italian fantasy television series
Films scored by Riz Ortolani